The Erste Liga (formerly the MOL Liga) is an international ice hockey league organized for clubs based in Hungary and Romania. It is sponsored by the Erste Bank Hungary. 

The games played between the Hungarian teams count towards the Hungarian National Championship in the OB I Bajnokság. The Romanian teams also compete in the Romanian National Championship Liga Naţională.

History

In the first season, the league comprised six Hungarian teams and four Romanian teams. HC Csíkszereda went undefeated in the post-season to win the first MOL Liga title. 

In 2009–10, the number of teams went down to five Hungarian and two Romanian teams. Following the regular season, they decided the winner in a final four system. The Budapest Stars met Újpesti TE in the final, after they beat SC Csíkszereda and DAB-Docler, respectively. Újpest started the match better, taking the lead just after one and a half minutes. However, the events took an U-turn and about two hours later, it was the Budapest Stars who lifted the trophy, after winning the match 3–1.

The 2010–11 MOL Liga season was the third edition of the international ice hockey championship for teams from Hungary and Romania. This season, nine teams participated, including defending champions Vasas Budapest Stars, the second team of Erste Bank Eishockey Liga outfit SAPA AV19 Székesfehérvár, and HSC Csíkszereda from Miercurea Ciuc 

The 2011–12 MOL Liga season was the fourth edition of the international ice hockey championship for teams from Hungary and Romania. Following the withdrawal of Vasas HC, the field is composed of eight clubs this season, including five Hungarian and three Romanian. The regular season ran from 6 September 2011 to 20 January 2012. After the conclusion of the regular season, the six best ranked teams won the right to participate in the playoffs. The top two clubs had byes in the first round of the playoffs, while the remaining four teams were drawn together according to their final position in the regular season (3–6, 4–5). The winners of the match-ups advanced to the semifinals, where they met DAB-Docler and HSC Csíkszereda, respectively. Eventually, Miskolci JJSE beat HSC Csíkszereda and thus secured their spot in the finals, where they faced Dunaújváros, which won their duel in straight matches against Corona Fenestela Braşov. Dunaújváros enjoyed the home ice advantage in the best-of-seven series final, where they swept away Miskolc 4–0 and took the 2011–12 MOL Liga title, the first ever of its kind in the history of the club.

The 2012–13 MOL Liga season was the fifth season of the MOL Liga, a multi-national ice hockey league consisting of teams from Hungary, Romania, and Slovakia. Seven teams participated in the league, and DAB-Docler won the championship. The league also served as the Hungarian Championship for 2012-13. DAB-Docler, the MOL Liga champion, was also the Hungarian national champion.

The 2013–14 MOL Liga season was the sixth season of the MOL Liga, and HC Nové Zámky won the title. The league is a multi-national ice hockey league consisting of teams from Hungary, Romania, and Slovakia. Balázs Ladányi from DAB-Docler was the season's leading scorer with 63 points.

The 2014–15 MOL Liga season was the seventh season of the MOL Liga. The league is a multi-national ice hockey league consisting of teams from Hungary, Romania, and Slovakia. HC Nové Zámky were the defending Champions after defeating ASC Corona Braşov in the 2014 Championship, but they lost their championship to Miskolci Jegesmedvék in a 4–0 sweep against them.

The 2015–16 MOL Liga season was the 8th season of the MOL Liga. DVTK Jegesmedvék was the defending champion after defeating HC Nové Zámky in the 2014-2015 season. They successfully defended their title after sweeping MAC Budapest in the finals. The league is a multi-national ice hockey league consisting of teams from Hungary and Romania. A new team, Budapest based MAC Budapest, joined the league while Slovakian based, and previous season's finalist, HC Nové Zámky left.

The 2016–17 MOL Liga season was the 9th season of the MOL Liga. DVTK Jegesmedvék was the two-time defending champion after defeating MAC Budapest in the 2015-2016 season. They once again successfully defended their title after beating MAC Budapest in the finals, this time in 5 games (4-1). A new team from Serbia, the Belgrade based HK Beograd, joined the league.

In July 2017, MOL, who was formerly the league's naming sponsor, decided against renewing their sponsorship. From the 2017-18 season onwards, the league will be known as the Erste Liga. DVTK Jegesmedvék is the three-time defending champion after defeating MAC Budapest in the 2016-2017 season. A new team from Austria, the second team of Erste Bank Eishockey Liga outfit Vienna Capitals, joined the league while three clubs, Hungarian based Debreceni HK, Romanian based Dunărea Galați and Serbian based HK Beograd, all left the league.

Teams

Champions

All-time standings

 1 Played as Miskolci Jegesmedvék JSE (Miskolci JJSE) from 2008–09 to 2014–15.
 2 Played as Alba Volán Székesfehérvár 2 from 2008–09 to 2009–10 and as SAPA Fehérvár AV19 2 from 2010–11 to 2015–16.
 3 Played as SC Miercurea Ciuc from 2008–09 to 2009–10.
 4 Played as DAB-Docler from 2008–09 to 2014–15.
 5 Played as SCM Fenestela 68 Brașov from 2008–09 to 2010–11, as Corona Fenestela Brașov from 2011–12 to 2012–13 and as Corona Brașov Wolves from 2013–14 to 2014–15.
 6 Also known as HC Mikron Nové Zámky during time in league from 2012–13 to 2014–15.
 7 Played as Steaua București from 2008–09 to 2009–10.
 8 Played as  Vasas HC Budapest Stars from 2008–09 to 2010–11.

Hungarian champions 

1937: Budapesti KE
1937/38: Budapesti KE (2)
1938/39: Budapesti KE (3)
1939/40: Budapesti KE (4)
1940/41: BBTE
1941/42: Budapesti KE (5)
1942/43: BBTE (2)
1943/44: Budapesti KE (6)
1944/45: Not held
1945/46: Budapesti KE (7)
1946/47: MTK Budapest
1947/48: MTK Budapest (2)
1948/49: MTK Budapest (3)
1949/50: Bp. Vörös Meteor
1950/51: Bp. Kinizsi
1951/52: Bp. Vörös Meteor (2)
1952/53: Bp. Postás
1953/54: Bp. Postás (2)
1954/55: Bp. Kinizsi (2)
1955/56: Bp. Kinizsi (3)
1956/57: Bp. Vörös Meteor (3)
1957/58: Újpesti Dózsa
1958/59: Bp. Vörös Meteor (4) 
1959/60: Újpest (2)
1960/61: Ferencvárosi TC (4)
1961/62: Ferencvárosi TC (5)
1962/63: Bp. Vörös Meteor (5) 
1963/64: Ferencvárosi TC (6)
1964/65: Újpesti Dózsa (3)
1965/66: Újpesti Dózsa (4)
1966/67: Ferencvárosi TC (7)
1967/68: Újpesti Dózsa (5)
1968/69: Újpesti Dózsa (6)
1969/70: Újpesti Dózsa (7)
1970/71: Ferencvárosi TC (8)
1971/72: Ferencvárosi TC (9)
1972/73: Ferencvárosi TC (10)
1973/74: Ferencvárosi TC (11)
1974/75: Ferencvárosi TC (12)
1975/76: Ferencvárosi TC (13)
1976/77: Ferencvárosi TC (14)
1977/78: Ferencvárosi TC (15)
1978/79: Ferencvárosi TC (16)
1979/80: Ferencvárosi TC (17)
1980/81: Székesfehérvári Volán SC
1981/82: Újpesti Dózsa (8) 
1982/83: Újpesti Dózsa (9)
1983/84: Ferencvárosi TC (18)
1984/85: Újpesti Dózsa (10)
1985/86: Újpesti Dózsa (11) 
1986/87: Újpesti Dózsa (12)
1987/88: Újpesti Dózsa (13)
1988/89: Ferencvárosi TC (19)
1989/90: Jászberényi Lehel HC
1990/91: Ferencvárosi TC (20)
1991/92: Ferencvárosi TC (21)
1992/93: Ferencvárosi TC (22)
1993/94: Ferencvárosi TC (23)
1994/95: Ferencvárosi TC (24)
1995/96: Dunaferr SE
1996/97: Ferencvárosi TC (25)
1997/98: Dunaferr SE (2)
1998/99: Alba Volán-Riceland (2)
1999/00: Dunaferr SE (3)
2000/01: Alba Volán-FeVita (3)
2001/02: Dunaferr SE (4)
2002/03: Alba Volán-FeVita (4) 
2003/04: Alba Volán-FeVita (5)
2004/05: Alba Volán-FeVita (6)
2005/06: Alba Volán-FeVita (7)
2006/07: Alba Volán-FeVita (8)
2007/08: Alba Volán SC (9)
2008/09: Alba Volán SC (10)
2009/10: SAPA Fehérvár AV 19 (11)
2010/11: SAPA Fehérvár AV 19 (12)
2011/12: SAPA Fehérvár AV 19 (13)
2012/13: DAB-Docler (5)
2013/14: DAB-Docler (6)(MOL Liga title winner HC Nové Zámky)
2014/15: Miskolci Jegesmedvék
2015/16: DVTK Jegesmedvék (2)
2016/17: DVTK Jegesmedvék (3)
2017/18: MAC Budapest (1)
2018/19: Ferencvárosi TC (26)
2019/20: Ferencvárosi TC (27)
2020/21: Ferencvárosi TC (28)
2021/22: Ferencvárosi TC (29)

Titles by club

References

External links
Official website

 
Sports leagues established in 2008
Professional ice hockey leagues in Austria
Professional ice hockey leagues in Hungary
Professional ice hockey leagues in Romania
Professional ice hockey leagues in Slovakia
Multi-national ice hockey leagues in Europe
Multi-national professional sports leagues